Professional wrestling in China has been a rarity since it became a republic in 1912.

History
Although professional wrestling did not exist after the foundings of the Republic of China in 1912 and the People's Republic of China in 1949, the art form originates from Japan has a long backstory with various organizations bickering back and forth, it's unclear how big the market is in China, and indeed, if there would even be enough to argue about. Ashley Desilva is a local independent wrestler who has performed all over the country, and wrestles under the ring name Ash Silva. He says that China is a fertile ground for professional wrestling.

Beginning in the mid-2010s, the United States-based WWE, expanded its market into China by performing several house shows in Shanghai and Beijing. The WWE Network over the top streaming service, launched in 2014, is currently available in Hong Kong, Macau and the Taiwan area.

Notably one of the WWE's profile stars, John Cena, speaks Mandarin.

Promotions
 Middle Kingdom Wrestling 
 Oriental Wrestling Entertainment

Notable wrestlers
Xia Li
Tian Bing
Yinling
Ho Ho Lun

See also

Sport in China

References

 
Sport in China